Bolivian hemorrhagic fever (BHF), also known as black typhus or Ordog Fever, is a hemorrhagic fever and zoonotic infectious disease originating in Bolivia after infection by Machupo mammarenavirus.

BHF was first identified in 1963 as an ambisense RNA virus of the Arenaviridae family, by a research group led by Karl Johnson. The mortality rate is estimated at 5 to 30 percent. Due to its pathogenicity, Machupo virus requires Biosafety Level Four conditions, the highest level.

During the period between February and March 2007, some 20 suspected BHF cases (3 fatal) were reported to the Servicio Departamental de Salud (SEDES) in Beni Department, Bolivia. In February 2008, at least 200 suspected new cases (12 fatal) were reported to SEDES. In November 2011, a second case was confirmed near the departmental capital of Trinidad, and a serosurvey was conducted to determine the extent of Machupo virus infections in the department. A SEDES expert involved in the survey expressed his concerns about the expansion of the virus to other provinces outside the endemic regions of Mamoré and Iténez provinces.

Epidemiology

History 
The disease was first encountered in 1962, in the Bolivian village of San Joaquín, hence the name "Bolivian" Hemorrhagic Fever. When initial investigations failed to find an arthropod carrier, other sources were sought before finally determining that the disease was carried by infected mice. Although mosquitoes were not the cause as originally suspected, the extermination of mosquitoes using DDT to prevent malaria proved to be indirectly responsible for the outbreak in that the accumulation of DDT in various animals along the food chain led to a shortage of cats in the village; subsequently, a mouse plague erupted in the village, leading to an epidemic.

Vectors 
The vector is the  large vesper mouse (Calomys callosus), a rodent indigenous to northern Bolivia. Infected animals are asymptomatic and shed the virus in excreta, thereby infecting humans. Evidence of person-to-person transmission of BHF exists but is believed to be rare.

Symptoms
The infection has a slow onset with fever, malaise, headache and myalgia, very similar to Malaria symptoms. Petechiae (blood spots) on the upper body and bleeding from the nose and gums are observed when the disease progresses to the hemorrhagic phase, usually within seven days of onset.  Severe hemorrhagic or neurologic symptoms are observed in about one third of patients. Neurologic symptoms involve tremors, delirium, and convulsions. The mortality rate is about 25%.

Prevention
Measures to reduce contact between the vesper mouse and humans may have contributed to limiting the number of outbreaks, with no cases identified between 1973 and 1994. Although there are no cures or vaccine for the disease, a vaccine developed for the genetically related Junín virus which causes Argentine hemorrhagic fever has shown evidence of cross-reactivity to Machupo virus, and may therefore be an effective prophylactic measure for people at high risk of infection. Post infection (and providing that the person survives the infection), those that have contracted BHF are usually immune to further infection of the disease.

Weaponization
Bolivian hemorrhagic fever was one of three hemorrhagic fevers and one of more than a dozen agents that the United States researched as potential biological weapons before the nation suspended its biological weapons program in 1969. Albert Nickel, a 53-year old animal caretaker at Fort Detrick, died in 1964 from the disease after being bitten by an infected mouse. Nickel Place, on Fort Detrick, is named in his honor. It was also under research by the Soviet Union, under the Biopreparat bureau.

Vaccine research
Investigational vaccines exist for Argentine hemorrhagic fever and RVF; however, neither is approved by FDA or commonly available in the United States.

The structure of the attachment glycoprotein has been determined by X-ray crystallography and this glycoprotein is likely to be an essential component of any successful vaccine.

References

Bibliography

 

Medical Microbiology 2nd Edition Mims et al. Mosby Publishing 1998 p 371

External links 

Arthropod-borne viral fevers and viral haemorrhagic fevers
Hemorrhagic fevers
Rodent-carried diseases
Biological weapons